Morph may refer to:

Biology 
 Morph (zoology), a visual or behavioral difference between organisms of distinct populations in a species
 Muller's morphs, a classification scheme for genetic mutations
 "-morph", a suffix commonly used in taxonomy

Computing 
 Morphing, in motion pictures and animations, a special effect that changes one image into another through a seamless transition
 Gryphon Software Morph, morphing software
 Morph target animation, a method of animating computer generated imagery

Fiction 
 Morph (TV series), animated television series
 The Amazing Adventures of Morph, a British stop-motion clay animation television show
 Morph (comics), an X-Men character of Marvel comics
 In Animorphs, "morphing" is alien technology that allows one to transform into any animal or person that one touches

Music 
 Morph, a 2014 album by Hins Cheung
 Morph, a 2018 album by Yentl en De Boer
 "Morph" (song), a 2018 song by Twenty One Pilots

Other uses 
 Morphs collaboration, a collaboration that studied the evolution of spiral galaxies using the Magellan and the Hubble Space Telescope
 Nokia Morph, a bendable concept mobile phone

See also
 Morpheme, the smallest component of a word, or other linguistic unit, that has semantic meaning
 Morpher (disambiguation)
 Morphic (disambiguation)
 Morphism, between two mathematical structures
 Morphogram, the representation of a morpheme by a grapheme based solely on its meaning
 Morphology (disambiguation)
 Polymorphism (disambiguation)